Hi/Lo is an algorithm and a key generation strategy used for generating unique keys for use in a database as a primary key. It uses a sequence-based hi-lo pattern to generate values. It can be used with domain-driven design (DDD). Hi/Lo is used in scenarios where an application needs its entities to have an identity prior to persistence. It is a value generation strategy. An alternative to Hi/Lo would be to generate keys as universally unique identifiers (UUID).

Explanation 
The preconditions are:
 There is a constant defined to hold the maximum low value. The value must be greater than zero. A suitable value could be 1000 or 32767.
 There is a variable defined to hold the currently assigned high value and it is assigned the value 0 (zero).
 There is a variable defined to hold the currently assigned low value and it is assigned the value of the maximum low value plus 1 (one).

The steps are:
 If the currently assigned low value is greater or equal than the maximum low value then call a function to fetch a new high value and reset the currently assigned low value to 0 (zero).
 Assign a key by multiplying the currently assigned high value with the maximum low value and adding the currently assigned low value.
 Increment the currently assigned low value by 1 (one).

Algorithm 
The internal state is retained across invocations. The  (integer) constant is a configuration option. get_next_hi is a function that retrieves a new high value from a database server. In a relational database management system this could be through a stored procedure.

Precondition:  must be set to a value greater than zero.

 algorithm generate_key is
     output: key as a positive integer
 
     if current_lo ≥ max_lo then
         current_hi := get_next_hi()
         current_lo := 0
 
     key := current_hi × max_lo + current_lo
     current_lo := current_lo + 1
 
     return key

Example 
Example implementation in Python. 
class HiloKeyGenerator:
    """Key generator that uses a Hi/Lo algorithm.

    Args:
      get_next_hi: A callable function that retrieves a new high value.
      max_lo: The maximum low value. Defaults to 1000.

    Raises:
      ValueError: If the value of max_lo is not greater than zero.
    """

    def __init__(self, get_next_hi: Callable[[], int], max_lo: int = 1000) -> None:
        if max_lo <= 0:
            raise ValueError("max_lo must be greater than zero.")
        self._current_hi = 0
        self._current_lo = max_lo + 1
        self._get_next_hi = get_next_hi
        self._max_lo = max_lo

    def generate_key(self) -> int:
        """Generate a new unique key."""
        if self._current_lo >= self._max_lo:
            self._current_hi = self._get_next_hi()
            self._current_lo = 0

        key = self._current_hi * self._max_lo + self._current_lo
        self._current_lo += 1

        return key

Output:
>>> def get_next_hi():
...     return 2  # From database server.
...
>>> generator = HiloKeyGenerator(get_next_hi)
>>> generator.generate_key()
2000
>>> generator.generate_key()
2001
>>> generator.generate_key()
2002

Books 
Very briefly mentioned in the 2003 book Java Persistence for Relational Databases by Richard Sperko on page 236.

Very briefly mentioned in the 2004 book Better, Faster, Lighter Java by Bruce Tate and Justin Gehtland on page 137.

Very briefly mentioned in the 2004 book Enterprise Java Development on a Budget: Leveraging Java Open Source by Brian Sam-Bodden and Christopher M Jud on page 386.

Explained in the 2015 book Learning NHibernate 4 by Suhas Chatekar on page 53 and 144–145.

Mentioned in the 2017 book NHibernate 4.x cookbook on page 35.

Mentioned in the 2018 book ASP.NET Core 2 Fundamentals on page 219.

Support 
Supported by Entity Framework Core (ORM for .NET Core) with Microsoft SQL Server using the UseHiLo extension method. Not supported by the predecessor Entity Framework.

Supported by Hibernate (ORM for Java) and NHibernate (ORM for .NET) through SequenceHiLoGenerator and TableHiLoGenerator. Had support since at least 2002. Had support since at least version 3.2 with code authored by Gavin King.

Supported by Doctrine (ORM for PHP) through the TableGenerator class.

Supported by Marten (persistence library for .NET) with PostgreSQL through the HiLoSequence class.

Supported by RavenDB (a NoSQL document database).

Not supported by Apache Cayenne, ServiceStack.OrmLite, Ruby on Rails Active Record, Dapper, and Dashing.

See also 
 Distributed transaction
 Domain-driven design (DDD)
 Primary key

References

External links 
 What's the Hi/Lo algorithm? - Stack Overflow
 The hi/lo algorithm - Vlad Mihalcea

Articles with example pseudocode
Articles with example Python (programming language) code
Database algorithms
Object-relational mapping